Field hockey was one of 26 sports featured at the 2010 Summer Youth Olympics from August 16–23, 2010 at Sengkang Hockey Stadium in Singapore. Players must have been born between January 1, 1993 and December 31, 1994.

Qualification
Each winner of five continental qualification tournaments gained automatic entry. The hosts Singapore were limited to fielding just one team. 
Singapore chose to field a boys' team, and the extra unused quota in the girls' tournament was allocated to Europe. The full list of qualified teams is as below:

Medal summary

References

External links
Official FIH website

 
2010 Summer Youth Olympics events
Youth Summer Olympics
2010
2010 Summer Youth Olympics